Relentless is the second live album by American stand-up comedian and satirist Bill Hicks, released in 1992 by Invasion Records. It was Hicks' final release before his death from pancreatic cancer in February 1994. The album contains a song, "Chicks Dig Jerks", written and performed by Marblehead Johnson, a band Hicks had formed with friends.

In 1997, Rykodisc issued remastered versions of both Relentless and its predecessor, Dangerous (1990), on CD, as well as the posthumous albums Arizona Bay and Rant in E-Minor.

Track listing
All material written by Bill Hicks, except "Chicks Dig Jerks", by Marblehead Johnson.

Personnel
Bill Hicks – performer
Marblehead Johnson – performer ("Chicks Dig Jerks")

Technical
Kevin Booth – producer, engineer
Fred Remmert – editing, mixing
Greg Mellang – cover photo
John Dobratz – cover photo
Bill Hicks – cover idea
Josh Weinstein – cover idea
Caveman Wellington – set-up
Tony the Landlord – breakdown
Eddie Garcia – mastering
Sloan (Millman Productions) – design
Alley Rutzel – art direction
Steven Saporta – executive producer
Peter Casperson – executive producer

DVD version
The film version, Relentless: Montreal International Comedy Festival 1991, was recorded at the Centaur Theatre during the annual Just for Laughs Comedy Festival in Montreal, Quebec, Canada. Despite the common title, the CD album was recorded at a separate performance, after the Just for Laughs festival had closed.

The film version was released on DVD in the US in 2004 as part of the compilation Bill Hicks Live: Satirist, Social Critic, Stand Up Comedian, then as a stand-alone Region 2 release n 2006, and as part of the 2015 Bill Hicks: The Complete Collection Box Set.

Track listing
"Intro/I Love My Job"
"I Don't Fit In/War"
"Fyffe, Alabama"
"Smoking"
"Sexual Thought"
"Religion"
"Time for a Question"
"Drugs and Music"
"My Point"

References

Bill Hicks albums
1992 live albums
Stand-up comedy concert films
Rykodisc live albums
Live comedy albums
Spoken word albums by American artists
1990s comedy albums
Stand-up comedy albums